HD 191806 is a star located in the northern constellation Cygnus. With an apparent magnitude of 8.093, it's undetectable with the naked eye, but can be seen with binoculars.

HD 191806 has a stellar classification of G0V, indicating that it is a G-type main sequence star. HD 191806 is estimated to be about 3 billion years old and has a metallicity nearly twice of the Sun's.

Planetary System 
Observations for exoplanets orbiting the star began in 2007 when it was selected by the N2K Consortium as a potential host due to its high metallicity. After ten years of, a team of astronomers found a super Jupiter orbiting the star. In 2022, the inclination and true mass of HD 191806 b were measured via astrometry.

See also 
 List of extrasolar planets

References 

Planetary systems with one confirmed planet
Cygnus (constellation)
Durchmusterung objects
191806
099306
G-type main-sequence stars
High-proper-motion stars